The Archdeacon of Kilmore is a senior ecclesiastical officer within the Diocese of Kilmore, Elphin and Ardagh. 

The archdeaconry can trace its history from Maelisa Mac Gillco Erain, the first known incumbent, who died in 1199 to the current incumbent Craig McCauley. McCauley  is responsible for the disciplinary supervision of the clergy  within his half of the Diocese of Kilmore, Elphin and Ardagh.

References

 
Lists of Anglican archdeacons in Ireland
Diocese of Kilmore, Elphin and Ardagh
Religion in County Cavan